Callidrepana nana is a moth in the family Drepanidae first described by Warren in 1922. It is found on Peninsular Malaysia and in Singapore and Indonesia (Bangka Island, Sumatra, Borneo).

References

Moths described in 1922
Drepaninae
Moths of Asia